Karen Horsens (born 1932) is a retired Danish minister. In 1981, she became the first woman to be a dean of the Church of Denmark when she was appointed to the cathedral provostship of Roskilde where she remained until her retirement in 1998.

Biography
Born on 18 September 1932 in Aalborg, Karen Horsens was one of the three daughters of the bicycle retailer Alfred Horsens (1897–1971) and Karla Kristensen (1900–1989). On matriculating from Aalborg Cathedral School in 1951, she decided to read theology which at the time was an unusual choice for a girl. In 1957, she became the first woman theologian to receive Aalborg University's gold medal for a dissertation on Bishop Peder Madsen. On graduating as Cand.theol. in 1958, she continued her studies abroad, first in Oslo and later in New York on a fellowship from the American Association of University Women.

In 1962, she was appointed a chaplain at the Church of Our Saviour in Copenhagen. It was here she met the organist Charley Olsen whom she married in 1968. They have one son together, Rasmus. She remained at the church for 20 years, becoming the parish priest in 1972.

Horsens became a board member of the clerical association Den Danske Præsteforening in 1974, becoming its chair from 1978 to 1982. She was an effective leader, campaigning for better salaries and working conditions for priests. In 1990, she published her sermons, which have since been frequently cited.

Since her husband died in 2011, Karen Horsens has been living as a widow in a small pensioner's home close to Roskilde Cathedral.

Awards
In 1986, Horsens was honoured as a Knight of the Order of the Dannebrog and in 1992 as a Knight 1sr Class.

References

1932 births
Living people
People from Aalborg
Ordination of women in Christianity
Danish Lutheran clergy
Women Lutheran clergy
Aarhus University alumni
Knights of the Order of the Dannebrog
Knights First Class of the Order of the Dannebrog